Anya Teixeira (1913 – 1992) was a Russian Empire-born British street photographer and photojournalist. Her work is held in the collection of the Victoria and Albert Museum, London.

Biography
Teixeira's family escaped the Russian Revolution in 1917, through a rescue mounted by her uncle Morris Gest, a New York City impresario. The family settled in Berlin in 1924 so as to be near at hand for the expected overthrow of the Bolshevik regime. Fifteen years later her family had to flee from the Nazis. Arriving in England in April, 1939, she found that refugees like her were only allowed to be domestic servants or factory workers but she was eventually allowed an office job. She was to be penned into various secretarial positions until her retirement in 1975. Photography was a spare time activity taken up seriously at age 47. Three years later she co-founded the Creative Photo Group in London which drew approval from the historians Helmut and Alison Gernsheim in their book A Concise History of Photography.

Exhibitions 

Fotoarbeiten, Congress Centrum, Hamburg
On Stage, Camden Arts Centre, London
Dancing in the Streets, Camden Arts Centre, London
World Press Photo, The Hague
Photokina (awarded Crystal Obelisk) Cologne
Art for Society, Whitechapel Art Gallery, London, 1978
Midland Arts Centre, Birmingham
Midland Group, Nottingham
British Council Travelling Exhibition (India, Pakistan, Sri Lanka)
British Council Theatre Exhibition, Lisbon
British Council Fringe Theatre Exhibition, Venezuela
Women's Images of Men, ICA, London, 1980

Collections
Teixeira's work is held in the following permanent collection:
Victoria and Albert Museum, London: 4 prints (as of 8 March 2022)

See also
 List of street photographers

References

General references
 Walter Boje (editor) Foto Prisma, April 1963
 Anya Teixeira (contributor) AP, Calls for formation of Creative Photo Group, 14 August 1963
 Ainslie Ellis (reviewer) British Journal of Photography, 16 October 1964
 Anya Teixeira (invited reviewer) The Photographic Journal of the Royal Photographic Society, November 1967

External links
Official website (archived 19 April 2019)

1913 births
1992 deaths
British women photographers
Street photographers
British people of Russian-Jewish descent
Jewish emigrants from Nazi Germany to the United Kingdom
Ukrainian Jews
Russian emigrants to Germany
20th-century British photographers
20th-century British women artists
20th-century women photographers